Charro Park is a baseball venue in Brownsville, TX on the campus of St. Joseph's Academy. The ballpark once hosted a game between the Kansas City Monarchs and the Brownsville Merchants in 1946. The Brownsville Tigers, a semi-pro team, once played their games at Charro Park.

References

Baseball venues in Texas